Landing Zones during the U.S.-involvement in the Vietnam War include:

 Landing Zone Albany, Central Highlands; involved in the Battle of Ia Drang
 Landing Zone Baldy, Quảng Nam Province
 Landing Zone Brace, Central Highlands
 Landing Zone Brillo Pad, Central Highlands
 Landing Zone Center, Quảng Tín Province; involved in the Battle of Landing Zone Center
 Landing Zone Colt (Landing Zone Ordway) Quảng Nam Province
 Landing Zone Dot, Tây Ninh Province
 Landing Zone East (Landing Zone Mary Lou) Quảng Nam Province
 Landing Zone English (Landing Zone Dog) Bình Định Province
 Landing Zone Hereford, Bình Định Province
 Landing Zone Kate, Quang Duc Province; U.S. Army base
 Landing Zone Leslie, Quảng Nam Province
 Landing Zone Liz, Quang Ngai Province
 Landing Zone Loon, Quảng Trị Province
 Landing Zone Mack, Quảng Trị Province
 Landing Zone Margo, Quảng Trị Province
 Landing Zone Oasis (Landing Zone Tuttle), central South Vietnam
 Landing Zone Peanuts, Quảng Trị Province
 Landing Zone Professional, Quang Tin Province
 Landing Zone Robin, Quảng Trị Province; involved in Operation Robin
 Landing Zone Schueller (Landing Zone Road), central South Vietnam
 Landing Zone Sierra, Quảng Trị Province
 Landing Zone Two Bits, Bình Định Province
 Landing Zone Uplift, coastal South Vietnam
 Landing Zone Virgin, Central Highlands
 Landing Zone X-Ray, Central Highlands

Landing Zones
Military installations of the United States in South Vietnam